Levi9 IT Services is a European provider of nearshore software engineering services with development and delivery centers across Serbia, Ukraine and Romania and headquarters in Amsterdam.

Technology Focus
Levi 9 IT Services runs .NET development centers in Serbia and Ukraine and maintains core development, data management and business intelligence Microsoft competences.

Java - the company is a partner of SUN Advantage Program and works in spheres of Enterprise Java and J2EE software development.

Board and Management Team

The company was founded in 2001 by Menno de Jong and Bernhard van Oranje, who along with Board of Advisers: Adrie Reinders, Willem Vermeend and Roel Pieper helped company to progress. 
Paul Schuyt has joined Levi9 IT Services management team in 2009. Prior to Levi9 assignment, Paul was in charge of Logica CMG as a Chief Executive.

The Nearshore Delivery Model 

Levi9 IT Services is one of the early adopters of Nearshore delivery model. The main idea of the concept is to reduce the complexity and risks associated with remoteness between customer and provider in offshore arrangements and to leverage geographical and cultural proximity of nearshore destinations.

Initiatives and Publicity

Levi9 IT Services in conjunction with Ricoh, Research-In-Motion, Metri Measurement Consulting and CIO Magazine hosts one of the popular high-profile Networking IT events in the Netherlands - The Double Dutch event. 

Levi9 IT Services CEO, Bernhard van Oranje is an acclaimed author and public speaker on Information Technology and Outsourcing subjects. Being a chairman of the CIO of the Year Award Event he brings his personal experience and knowledge into recognizing the best IT minds. In association with the CIO platform Nederland and CIO Magazine the award rates Top 100 organizations and elect best 10 CIO's of the year in the Netherlands.

1 April 2010 Paul Schuyt, Menno de Jong, and Bernhard van Oranje have officially opened a regular session of NYSE Euronext with bell ceremony.

References

External links
 

Software companies of the Netherlands
Outsourcing companies
Companies based in Amsterdam